Stephen Hart may refer to:

 Stephen Hart (bishop) (1866–1952), Australian Anglican bishop
 Stephen Hart (footballer) (born 1960), Trinidadian association football manager
 Stephen R. Hart (born 1958), Canadian actor
 Steve Hart (1859–1880), Australian bushranger
 Steve Hart (singer) (born 1972), lead singer of pop group Worlds Apart
 Stephen Hart (water polo) (born 1953), Canadian Olympic water polo player
 Stephen Hart, fictional character in the British TV series Primeval, see List of Primeval characters#Stephen Hart
 J. Steven Hart, lobbyist, Williams & Jensen PLLC, and member, Congressional Award Foundation Board of Directors

See also
 Hart (surname)